Gâlcești may refer to several places in Romania:

 Gâlcești, a village in Poiana Lacului Commune, Argeș County
 Gâlcești, a village in Berlești Commune, Gorj County
 Gâlcești (river), a tributary of the Amaradia in Gorj County